Dand Aw Patan District ( ḍanḍ aw paṭān wuləswāləi) is a district of Paktia Province, Afghanistan. The district is within the heartland of the Zazi tribe of Pashtuns. It lies on the Durand Line border with the Kurram District of Pakistan's Khyber Pakhtunkhwa.

Security and Politics
On 19 August 2009 the Taliban attacked a border police check-post, killing one policeman.

On 29 May 2020, the Taliban stormed border security forces check posts in Dand Aw Patan District. 14 Afghan security personnel were killed in the attack and three others were injured. Two Taliban insurgents were also killed during the attack. The attack came soon after the end of the three-day Eid ceasefire announced by the Taliban, which lasted from 24 to 26 May 2020.

References

Districts of Paktia Province